There were two battles of El Alamein in World War II, both fought in 1942. The Battles occurred in North Africa, in Egypt, in and around an area named after a railway stop called El Alamein.

 First Battle of El Alamein: 1–27 July 1942
 Second Battle of El Alamein: 23 October – 4 November 1942

In addition, the Battle of Alam el Halfa (30 August – 5 September 1942) was fought between both battles and in the same location.

ja:エル・アラメインの戦い